New Life College (NLC) is a Ministry of Nava Jeeva Ashram, the non-profit society founded by Dr. John Thannickal in 1978 in Bangalore, Karnataka, India. Over 700 have graduated since its inception, serving the cause of the Church in South and South-East Asia  as pastors, evangelists and teachers.

The college was started at St. Thomas Town, Bangalore and was subsequently moved to the new campus at Hennur, Bangalore in 2002.Students come from all over India. NLC celebrated its Silver Jubilee Year in 2003.

Location
New Life College is located on the outer ring road of Bangalore at the junction of Hennur main Road. The college is visible from the ring road, 100 yards west of Hennur Main Road. The Bangalore Bus depot at Hennur is less than half a kilometer from the College.

The front gate of the New Life College is on the Ashram Road connecting to Hennur Main Road. Bangalore International Airport is 35 km from the college. City buses 292- 296 (A-F) connects to Hennur bus Depot.

Music education
The NLC choir performs in Bangalore but in states across South India. The Center for Music Education, Bangalore (the music education department of New Life College) offers training in musical instruments and offers Degree level programs in Western Music. Dr. Vinita Henson is the Director for the Music Department. She has a Doctorate of Music Education from University of Southern California.Link to CME

Accreditation
The programs are accredited by the Asia Theological Association (ATA) located in Bangalore, India

Courses offered

Master of Divinity (M.Div)
 3 years for secular college graduates.
 2 years course for B.Th graduates.

Bachelor of Theology (B.Th)
 3-year course for P.U.C or equivalent.

Diploma in Theology (Dip.Th)
 2 years course for P.U.C passed.
English program offered in the evenings.

Certificate in Theology (C.Th)
 2 years course for P.U.C passed.
Tamil program offered in the evenings.

 

The Bachelor of Theology program is designed to prepare students for Church ministries. The course includes the study of the Bible, Christian Theology, Church History, World Religions and Philosophy, Missions, Pastoral communication, etc.

The Diploma in Theology program is a two-year evening Bible Training program for pastors, lay leaders who desire to know the systematic study of Bible and Theology.

The Certificate in Theology program is a two-year evening Bible training program for pastors and lay leaders who desire a systematic study of Bible and theology offered with strong ministerial focus.

References

External links
Eastern Fare Music Foundation
New Life College - website
Center for Music Education - website
Music education in Bangalore

Non-profit organisations based in India
Christian universities and colleges in India
Music schools in Bangalore
Colleges in Bangalore
1978 establishments in Karnataka